The 1945 VMI Keydets football team was an American football team that represented the Virginia Military Institute (VMI) during the 1945 college football season as a member of the Southern Conference. In their ninth year under head coach Pooley Hubert, the team compiled an overall record of 5–4.

Schedule

References

VMI
VMI Keydets football seasons
VMI Keydets football